KCPO may refer to:

Knight Commander of the Pontifical Order of Pius IX, a class in one of the orders of knighthood of the Holy See
KCPO-LP, Channel 26, an independent television station in Sioux Falls, South Dakota